The 1942 LFF Lyga was the 21st season of the LFF Lyga football competition in Lithuania.  LFLS Kaunas won the championship.

Kaunas Group

Šiauliai Group

Panevėžys Group

Sūduva Group
Sveikata Kybartai 6-0 Sūduva Marijampolė

Ukmergė Group
Perkūnas Ukmergė

Žemaitija Group
Džiugas Telšiai 2-1 Babrungas Plungė

Quarterfinal
Gubernija Šiauliai 8-2 Džiugas Telšiai
MSK Panevėžys 5-2 Perkūnas Ukmergė
LFLS Kaunas 5-1 Sveikata Kybartai

Semifinal
MSK Panevėžys 5-1 Gubernija Šiauliai
LFLS Kaunas 3-1 LFLS Vilnius

Final
LFLS Kaunas 2-0 MSK Panevėžys

References
RSSSF

LFF Lyga seasons
1942 in Lithuanian football
Lith